Le périscope is a 1916 silent French film directed by Abel Gance.

Cast
 Albert Dieudonné as William Bell
 Henri Maillard as Damores
 Yvonne Sergyl as Manoela Damores
 Georges Raulin as Geoffrey Bell
 Mlle Savigny as Clelia Damores

References

External links

1916 films
1910s French-language films
French silent films
French black-and-white films
Films directed by Abel Gance
1910s French films